Červeňany is a village and municipality in the Veľký Krtíš District of the Banská Bystrica Region of southern Slovakia.

History
The village was first mentioned in 1345 (Verus). It belonged to Divín castle.

Genealogical resources

The records for genealogical research are available at the state archive "Statny Archiv in Banska Bystrica, Slovakia"

 Lutheran church records (births/marriages/deaths): 1727-1895 (parish B)

See also
 List of municipalities and towns in Slovakia

External links
 
http://www.statistics.sk/mosmis/eng/run.html
http://www.e-obce.sk/obec/cervenany/cervenany.html
Surnames of living people in Cervenany

Villages and municipalities in Veľký Krtíš District